Rubus pensilvanicus, known commonly as Pennsylvania blackberry, is a prickly bramble native to eastern and central North America from Newfoundland south to Georgia, west as far as Ontario, Minnesota, Nebraska, and Arkansas. The species is also established as a naturalized plant in California.

Rubus pensilvanicus is a prickly shrub up to 3 meters (10 feet) tall. The canes are green at first but then turn dark red, usually ridged, with copious straight prickles. The leaves are palmately compound, usually bearing 5 or 7 leaflets. The flowers are white with large petals, borne in mid-spring. The fruits are large aggregates of 10-100 black drupelets, somewhat sweet and often used for jams and jellies.

The genetics of Rubus is extremely complex, making it difficult to separate the group into species. What some authors lump together as R. pensilvanicus, other authors split into as many as 50 or 60 species.

References

External links
 
 
 
 Jepson Manual Treatment
 
 
 

pensilvanicus
Flora of North America
Plants described in 1804
Berries